This is a list of seasons completed by the Portland Steel. The Steel were a professional arena football franchise of the Arena Football League (AFL), based in Portland, Oregon. The team was established in 2013 as the Portland Thunder and they played their first season in 2014. The team's name was changed to the Portland Steel prior to the 2016 season. They made the playoffs twice. They folded after the 2016 season.

References
General
 
 

Arena Football League seasons by team
 
Portland, Oregon-related lists
Oregon sports-related lists